Marco Aurélio Spall Maia, better known as Marco Maia (born 27 December 1965), is a Brazilian politician, and the President of the Chamber of Deputies of Brazil from 2010 to 2013. A metalworker and union leader by trade, Maia joined the Workers' Party in 1985.

References

Workers' Party (Brazil) politicians
Living people
Brazilian people of Portuguese descent
Brazilian people of English descent
People from Canoas
1965 births
Presidents of the Chamber of Deputies (Brazil)